The Global Network for Advanced Management is a collaboration of graduate schools of business that seeks to foster intellectual ties among business schools, students and deans from both economically strong regions and those on the horizon of economic development. It was founded by a consortium of 21 schools and launched on April 27, 2012. The Global Network has since expanded to include 30 member schools. is my website GlobalNetwork

Objectives
The Global Network for Advanced Management was founded on the premise that enterprises need leaders who understand how markets and organizations work in increasingly diverse and complex contexts. The network provides an organizational structure to facilitate connections among faculty, students, and alumni from diverse regions, cultures, and economies in different phases of development. Chief goals are the exchange of ideas, collaboration on data collection, and the promotion of research in areas of interest to global commerce. Member schools share course materials, including case studies that incorporate specialized regional expertise.

Activities
The Global Network is a platform for innovation, hosting programs that include Global Network Weeks, which give students at network schools the opportunity to travel to another Network school for a one-week intensive mini-course that takes advantage of localized expertise; Global Network Courses, online graduate-level business courses that connect students at member schools in group project work; and Global Network cases, teaching materials that examine business challenges from the points of view of at least two Global Network regions.

In January 2014, the Global Network hosted two sessions at "Business + Society: Leadership in an Increasingly Complex World," a conference at the Yale School of Management. Deans and directors from nine Global Network schools discussed the skills they believed critical to leaders with moderator Margaret Warner in a panel entitled "Preparing Leaders for a Flatter World." Faculty, deans, and students from three network schools participated in "Bank of Ireland: A Raw Case Study" with American investor Wilbur Ross.

As of 2018, 7,376 students have participated in Global Network Week courses and 1,163 have taken the closed MOOC courses called Small Network Online Courses or SNOCs.  2,386 students from Yale School of Management, HEC Paris, EGADE, and Smurfit Business School have participated in the Global Virtual Teams course.

Members
The network includes graduate management schools on six continents:

EUROPE, MIDDLE EAST, AFRICA
 ESMT Berlin, Germany
 HEC Paris, France
 IE Business School, Spain
 IMD, Switzerland
 Koç University Graduate School of Business, Turkey
 Lagos Business School, Pan-Atlantic University, Nigeria
 Moscow School of Management SKOLKOVO, Russia
 Saïd Business School, University of Oxford, United Kingdom
 SDA Bocconi School of Management, Bocconi University, Italy
 Strathmore Business School, Kenya
 Technion-Israel Institute of Technology, Israel
 UCD Michael Smurfit Graduate Business School, Ireland
 University of Cape Town Graduate School of Business, South Africa
 University of Ghana Business School, Ghana

AMERICAS
 EGADE Business School, Tecnológico de Monterrey, Mexico
 FGV Escola de Administração de Empresas de São Paulo, Brazil
 Haas School of Business, University of California Berkeley, United States
 INCAE Business School, Costa Rica
 Pontificia Universidad Católica de Chile School of Business, Chile
 UBC Sauder School of Business, Canada
 Yale School of Management, United States

ASIA PACIFIC
 Asian Institute of Management, Philippines
 Business School, Renmin University of China, China
 Fudan University School of Management, China
 Hitotsubashi University Business School, School of International Corporate Strategy, Japan
 Hong Kong University of Science and Technology Business School, Hong Kong SAR China
 Indian Institute of Management Bangalore, India
 National University of Singapore Business School, Singapore
 Seoul National University Business School, South Korea
 University of Indonesia Faculty of Economics, Indonesia
 UNSW Business School, Australia

References

Further reading
 SOM launches global network | Yale Daily News
 New SOM degree program launches | Yale Daily News
 SOM network follows unconventional model | Yale Daily News

External links
 Official website
 White Paper on Global Network for Advanced Management

Business education
International college and university associations and consortia
Educational institutions established in 2012